Antoni Cossu (1927–2002) was a Sardinian novelist and poet.  He studied literature in Milan before returning to Sardinia in 1959.  For a time he also edited the periodical Il Montiferru.

1927 births
2002 deaths
Italian male poets
20th-century Italian poets
20th-century Italian male writers